Yussuf Yurary Poulsen (born 15 June 1994) is a Danish professional footballer who plays as a striker for Bundesliga club RB Leipzig and the Denmark national team. He sometimes uses Yurary as his shirt name.

After starting his professional career with Lyngby, he transferred to RB Leipzig in 2013, helping them from the 3. Liga to the Bundesliga in the space of three seasons. He holds the RB Leipzig record for most appearances with over 300, and has scored over 80 goals for the club. He played in the DFB-Pokal final in 2019 and 2021.

Poulsen made his international debut for Denmark in 2014 and has earned over sixty caps. He was part of their squad at the 2018 FIFA World Cup and UEFA Euro 2020, reaching the semi-finals of the latter.

Early life
Poulsen was born to a Tanzanian father and a Danish mother. His father worked on a container ship, oscillating between Tanga and Denmark before he settled in Copenhagen. He died of cancer when Poulsen was six years old.

Club career

Early career
Poulsen began playing football at BK Skjold. At first he was a defensive player and in Kenneth Zohore he had a teammate, with whom he was to play later in the Danish youth national teams. After Zohoré joined FC Copenhagen, Poulsen was moved to a position as a striker.

Lyngby BK
At the age of 14 he joined the youth ranks of Lyngby BK. He played his first match as a senior on 4 December 2011, when he came on the pitch against AC Horsens after 84 minutes, as a substitute for Mathias Tauber. Poulsen did not immediately establish himself in the starting eleven, and he was at the end of the season only on five appearances. His club, Lyngby were also relegated from Superligaen. 5 August 2012 he scored his first goal at senior level, as well as for his club, when he in the second match in the 1. Division (second Danish league) scored the 1-0 winning goal against AB Gladsaxe. He was a regular player in the starting 11, and played 32 matches, scoring eleven goals.

RB Leipzig
His achievements attracted the interest of foreign and domestic clubs, and on 3 July 2013, he signed a contract with the newly promoted 3. Liga German side RB Leipzig. He made his club debut on 19 July 2013 in a 1–0 win at Hallescher FC, and scored his first goals in a 2–0 home win over Rot-Weiss Essen on 24 August, and netted two more in the final game on 10 May 2014 to win 3–1 at Stuttgarter Kickers. He finished the 2013–14 season with 10 goals in 36 appearances as his team were promoted as runners-up.

In his first season in the 2. Bundesliga, Poulsen scored 12 goals in 32 appearances during the 2014–15 season as his team came fifth. He was sent off on 23 February in a 1–1 draw at Eintracht Braunschweig.

Poulsen seven goals in 32 appearances during the 2015–16 season as RB Leipzig won promotion as runners-up to SC Freiburg. On 28 August 2016, he played in RB Leipzig's first Bundesliga match, and in the sixth match of the 2016–17 season, he scored his first Bundesliga goal in a 2–1 victory at home against FC Augsburg on 30 September. He finished the 2016–17 season with five goals in 30 appearances.

Poulsen finished the 2017–18 season five goals in 41 appearances. This included one on 14 October 2017 in a 3–2 win at Borussia Dortmund, the hosts' first home defeat in 41 games.

On 30 March 2019, during a 5–0 win over Hertha BSC, he became the first-ever Leipzig player to score a hat-trick in the Bundesliga and in the process helped the club record its 50th ever win in the competition. His treble also took him to 15 league goals for the campaign which meant he became only the third Danish player, after Ebbe Sand and Allan Simonsen to score more than 14 Bundesliga goals in a single season. In the same month, he extended his contract by a year to 2022. His team were runners-up in the 2019 DFB-Pokal Final; he scored in 3–1 wins in the first round at FC Viktoria Köln and the semi-final at Hamburger SV.

Poulsen became the first Leipzig player to 250 appearances on 24 May 2020, when he scored in a 5–0 win at 1. FSV Mainz 05. He was then ruled out for the rest of the season with ankle ligament damage.

He scored five times on the way to the 2021 DFB-Pokal final, including two in a 4–0 home win over VfL Bochum in the last 16. On 28 October 2021, he reached 300 matches in a 2–1 home loss to Club Brugge KV in the Champions League group stage.

International career
Poulsen was eligible to play for Tanzania but did not receive any offers from the Tanzanian federation; as a result, he chose to represent his native Denmark.

He made his debut for the Danish national team on 30 January 2013 against Mexico. On 13 June 2015, he scored his first goal for his country, against Serbia in a 2–0 win. Poulsen was selected in Denmark's squad for the 2016 Summer Olympics, however he rejected the call-up in order to cement his place at Leipzig.

In May 2018, he was named in Denmark's 23-man squad for the 2018 FIFA World Cup in Russia. On 16 June, he scored the lone goal in their opening game against Peru, and was named man of the match. Earlier in the game he conceded a penalty with a foul on Christian Cueva, which the Peruvian missed.

Poulsen was part of the Danish squad that reached the semi-finals of UEFA Euro 2020 in the summer of 2021. He scored his first goal in the European Championship in a 2–1 defeat to Belgium on 17 June, adding another four days later in a 4–1 win over Russia.

Career statistics

Club

International

As of match played 7 September 2021. Denmark score listed first, score column indicates score after each Poulsen goal.

Honours
RB Leipzig
 DFB-Pokal: 2021–22; runner-up: 2018–19, 2020–21
Individual
Bundesliga Goal of the Month: October 2020

References

External links

Profile at the RB Leipzig website
Danish national team profile 
Complete League statistics at danskfodbold.com 

1994 births
Living people
Footballers from Copenhagen
Association football forwards
Danish men's footballers
Danish people of Tanzanian descent
Denmark international footballers
Denmark youth international footballers
Denmark under-21 international footballers
Lyngby Boldklub players
RB Leipzig players
Danish Superliga players
Danish 1st Division players
Bundesliga players
2. Bundesliga players
3. Liga players
2018 FIFA World Cup players
UEFA Euro 2020 players
2022 FIFA World Cup players
Danish expatriate men's footballers
Danish expatriate sportspeople in Germany
Expatriate footballers in Germany